Cao Cao's invasion of Xu Province was a punitive invasion launched by the warlord Cao Cao against Tao Qian, the Governor of Xu Province, in the late Eastern Han dynasty. The casus belli for the invasion was the murder of Cao Cao's father, Cao Song, in Xu Province. Although Tao Qian's culpability was questionable, Cao Cao nonetheless held him responsible. The invasion took place in two separate waves in 193 and 194, during each of which Cao Cao captured a number of towns and engaged in collective punishment of the civilian populace.

Background

Cao Cao's father Cao Song was living in his hometown Qiao (譙; present-day Bozhou, Anhui) after retirement until it became a battlefield when the Campaign against Dong Zhuo happened. So Cao Song along with the rest of Cao's family moved to Langya (琅邪; present-day Linyi, Shandong) in Xu Province. By 193, Cao Cao had established a base in Yan Province (covering present-day southwestern Shandong and eastern Henan), and invited his father over to his territory. However, before Cao's family could reunite, they were murdered on the border of Xu Province and Yan Province. There were two accounts of how they were murdered. One was that the governor of Xu Province, Tao Qian, sent his men to kill Cao's family because he was defeated by Cao several times. The other was that Tao Qian actually sent people to protect Cao's family because he was afraid of Cao Cao. But his men killed Cao's family for the great fortune they owned. Regardless of Tao Qian's culpability, Cao Cao intended to hold him responsible for the murder of his father.

The first invasion
In the summer or autumn of 193, Cao Cao invaded Xu Province with an unspecified number of troops and easily captured over ten cities. After conquering Pengcheng (彭城; present-day Xuzhou, Jiangsu), Cao Cao killed possibly more than 10,000 defenders. Tao Qian fled to Tan (剡; present-day Tancheng County, Linyi, Shandong), which Cao Cao assaulted unsuccessfully.

Thwarted and low on rations Cao Cao turned his army around, sacking in the process the counties of Qulü, Suiling, and Xiaqiu. The local population was swollen with refugees from the violence of the capital regions. Cao Cao's army killed over 100,000 civilians, including both men and women, such that the Si River was stoppered up with their corpses. His army took the chickens and dogs for food and tore down the villages into ruins.

The second invasion
In the spring of 194, Cao Cao's army returned to Xu Province, and Tao Qian begged aid from Tian Kai in the nearby Qing Province. Tian Kai sent Tao Qian a force of some thousand men commanded by Liu Bei. Tao Qian, seeking to open a southern front against Cao Cao, appointed Liu Bei as the Inspector of Yu Province, and transferred 4,000 soldiers into his service. Along with Tao Qian's officer Cao Bao, Liu Bei encamped east of Tan.

Cao Cao's army plundered Langya and Donghai (東海; near present-day Tancheng, Shandong), destroying all in its path. Returning west, Cao Cao engaged and defeated Tao Qian's forces led by Liu Bei. According to one source, Cao Cao conquered the nearby city of Xiangben after this.

Xu Province was only granted reprieve when Zhang Miao betrayed Cao Cao and invited Lü Bu to take over Cao Cao's home base in Yan Province. Cao Cao broke off his vengeance against Tao Qian and turned his army back to attack Lü Bu.

Aftermath
Liu Bei shifted his alliance from Tian Kai towards Tao Qian and he remained in Xu Province after Cao Cao left. When Tao Qian died of illness later in 194, his sons Tao Shang and Tao Ying were passed over for governorship by the local elite in favour of Liu Bei. Thus Liu Bei gained his first territory as a result of Cao Cao's campaign.

In popular culture
Cao Cao's invasion of Xu Province is featured as playable stages in the seventh and eighth instalments of Koei's Dynasty Warriors video game series.

Notes

  The Zizhi Tongjian (60.1945) has "autumn", while the Records of the Three Kingdoms (1.11) has "summer". History of Chinese Warfare specifies "the sixth month" (vol. 4, p 67), which would have been around August.
  This casualty statistic, which appears in Tao Qian's biography in Records of the Three Kingdoms (8.249), is attached to a phrase describing the Si River being dammed with the bodies of the dead. According to Rafe de Crespigny (To Establish Peace, volume 1, internet edition (2004), p. 68 note 24 [internet pagination]), this is unsupported by geography and probably happened during Cao Cao's massacre of civilians somewhat farther south, not during his battle at Pengcheng. Thus, the casualty figure is most probably not reliable.
  The Book of the Later Han (73.2367) also includes Pengcheng and Fuyang (傅陽; in present-day Linyi, Shandong) among Cao Cao's ravages.

References

Bibliography
Chen Shou, 三國志 (Records of the Three Kingdoms), 280s or 290s. Pei Songzhi, annotation, 429. Hong Kong: Zhonghua Publishing, 1971. 5 vols.
 
Fan Ye, et al., 後漢書 (Book of the Later Han), 445. Beijing: Zhonghua Publishing, 1965. 12 vols.
Sima Guang, et al., 資治通鑒 (Zizhi Tongjian), 1084. Hu Sanxing, annotation, 1286. Beijing: Zhonghua Publishing, 1956. 20 vols.

193
194
Military history of Jiangsu
190s conflicts
Rebellions during the end of the Han dynasty
Punitive expeditions
Cao Cao